Roberto Lazzari (14 December 1937 – 31 July 2017) was an Italian former breaststroke swimmer who won two medals at the 1958 European Aquatics Championships in the 200 m breaststroke and 4 × 100 m medley relay. He finished in fifth and sixth place, respectively, in the same events at the 1960 Summer Olympics.

References

1937 births
2017 deaths
Italian male breaststroke swimmers
Olympic swimmers of Italy
Swimmers at the 1960 Summer Olympics
European Aquatics Championships medalists in swimming
Universiade medalists in swimming
Mediterranean Games gold medalists for Italy
Mediterranean Games medalists in swimming
Swimmers at the 1959 Mediterranean Games
Universiade gold medalists for Italy
Medalists at the 1959 Summer Universiade
Swimmers at the 1955 Mediterranean Games
20th-century Italian people
21st-century Italian people
Swimmers from Milan